Alec Damian Gallimore is an American aerospace engineer, currently serving as Dean of Engineering of the University of Michigan. 

He is the Robert J. Vlasic Dean of Engineering and the Richard F. and Eleanor A. Towner Professor of Engineering of the University of Michigan College of Engineering. He founded the Plasmadynamics and Electric Propulsion Laboratory in 1992.

Early life and education
Gallimore was born in Washington, DC to Jamaican immigrant parents Kathleen and Lascelles Gallimore but raised in Harrington Park, New Jersey, US. 

Gallimore received a bachelor of science in aeronautical engineering from Rensselaer Polytechnic Institute in 1986. He received a master of arts and a doctor of philosophy in aerospace engineering from Princeton University in 1988 and in 1992, respectively.

Career
Following his undergraduate degree, Gallimore was one of 40 engineering and science college students selected to participate in a summer program at the NASA Lewis Research Center. Following his PhD, Gallimore intended on pursuing a career with NASA but was informed he needed more experience. As a result, he chose to join the faculty at the University of Michigan College of Engineering to improve his public speaking. Upon joining the faculty, Gallimore founded the Plasmadynamics and Electric Propulsion Laboratory. He originally intended to return to NASA after five years of teaching but chose to pursue a career in academia instead. From 2005 to 2011, Gallimore served as an associate dean at the Horace H. Rackham School of Graduate Studies and from 2011 to 2013 he was the associate dean for research and graduate education.

As founding director of the Plasmadynamics and Electric Propulsion Laboratory (PEPL), Gallimore focused his research on electric propulsion, plasma diagnostics, space plasma simulation, electrode physics, nano-particle energetics, and hypersonic aerodynamics’ interaction with plasma. The PEPL was originally interested in improving and enhancing the Large Vacuum Test Facility (LVTF), a 20 by 30-foot vacuum chamber, and a small standalone vacuum antechamber. In 2015, the laboratory designed an X3 Nested-Channel Hall Thruster to be used in NASA's Next Space Technologies for Exploration Partnerships (NextSTEP).

Beyond his efforts in the PEPL, Gallimore served as director for the NASA Michigan Space Grant Consortium and for the Michigan/Air Force Center of Excellence in Electric Propulsion. In February 2016, Gallimore was named the next Robert J. Vlasic Dean of Engineering from July 1, 2016, through June 30, 2021. While serving in this role, he was elected to the National Academy of Engineering for "advanced spacecraft electric propulsion, especially Hall thruster technology." In 2020, Gallimore was presented with the American Institute of Aeronautics and Astronautics Wyld Propulsion Award for his "groundbreaking achievements and leadership in technology and workforce development that have contributed significantly to increased utilization of spacecraft electric propulsion systems."

References

Living people
African-American engineers
American aerospace engineers
Rensselaer Polytechnic Institute alumni
Princeton University alumni
University of Michigan faculty
Members of the United States National Academy of Engineering
Year of birth missing (living people)